Liaan Ferreira (born 2 July 1986) is a multi-award-winning actor. He is best known for his roles in the television series 7de Laan and “Getroud met rugby”.

Personal life
He was born on 2 July 1986 in South Africa. He is married to Ruwé Jana.

Career
He started acting at the age of 11, where he did stage performances and fell in love with the art. Liaan Ferreira very quickly proved that he is a versatile and multi talented artist. Other works include many theatre productions over the years, as well as His standing ovation stage performance that captivated the audience as Anti-Hero Tom Buchanan in the world renowned novel “The Great Gatsby” at the historical Playhouse Theatre in Somerset West. Then he started acting with D&A management in Cape Town. In 2013, he joined with the Heat ManWatch Competition. In 2014, he acted in the television serial SAF3 with the role "Cole". Then in 2017, he made a cameo role in the serial 90 Plein Street. However, his first notable television role came through the popular television serial 7de Laan, where he played the role "Llewellyn Paulsen". He retired from the serial in mid 2021. Then in 2021, he joined with the cast of KYKNET serial Getroud met rugby with the role "Frank du Plooy", a no-nonsense handsome young lawyer.

In 2021, he acted in the award winning critics acclaimed short film Visor. His role was highly praised by the critics, where he won 21 Best Actor Awards with 28 nominations for his role: September Award at the Accord Cine Fest, Best Actor in an Indie Film at the Actors Awards, Los Angeles, Best Leading Actor in a Film at the Art Film Awards, Best Actor with Honorable Mention at the Athens International Monthly Art Film Festival, Gold Award	for Best Actor in a Drama at the Best Actor Award Ceremony, Best Male Performance at the Best Istanbul Film Festival, Best Actor at the Festigious International Film Festival, Best Actor at the FilmCon Awards and many more. Meanwhile, his notable performance in the short listed him on the Hollywood film festivals' "Top 10 Actors to Watch for 2021" list.

Apart from that, his short film Fistful of Dreams was awarded the Fall Award for Best Cinematography at the AltFF Alternative Film Festival.

Filmography

Awards

Wins
 Actors Awards, Los Angeles 2021 Actors Award for Best Actor in an Indie Film = Visor (2021)
 AltFF Alternative Film Festival 2021 Fall Award for Best Cinematography = Fistful of Dreams (2021) (Shared with: Zandre Ferreira)  
 Art Film Awards 2021 Art Film Award for Best Leading Actor in a Film = Visor (2021) 
 Athens International Monthly Art Film Festival 2021 Honorable Mention for Best Actor = Visor (2021) 
 Best Actor Award 2021	Gold Award for Best Actor in a Drama = Visor (2021) 
 Best Istanbul Film Festival 2021 Best Istanbul Film Festival Award for Best Male Performance = Visor (2021) 
 Festigious International Film Festival 2021 Honorable Mention for Best Actor = Visor (2021) 
 FilmCon Awards 2021 September FilmCon Award for Best Actor = Visor (2021) 
 Halicarnassus Film Festival 2021 Special Winner for Best Actor = Visor (2021) 
 Indie Movies Spark Film Festival 2021	August Award for Best Leading Actor in an Indie Film = Visor (2021)
 New York Film Awards 2021	August Award for Best Actor in an Indie Film = Visor (2021)
 New York International Film Awards 2021 Honorable Mention for Best Actor = Visor (2021) 
 New York Movie Awards 2021 Honorable Mention for Best Actor = Visor (2021)
 Oniros Film Awards 2021 Jury Prize for Best Actor = Visor (2021) 
 Top Shorts Film Festival 2021	September Award for Best Actor in an Indie Film = Visor (2021)
 V.i.Z Film Fest 2021 Jury Prize for Best Short Film Actor = Visor (2021)

Nominations
 Accord Cine Fest 2021	September Award	Best Actor = Visor (2021)  
 Paris Film Festival 2021	Best Actor = Visor (2021) 
 New York Neorealism Film Awards 2021	Jury Prize	Best Actor = Visor (2021) 
 London Shorts 2021 Best Actor = Visor (2021)
 Los Angeles Film Awards 2021 Festival Award	Best Actor = Visor (2021)
 New Jersey Film Awards 2021 August Award	Best Actor = Visor (2021) 
 Hollywood International Golden Age Festival 2021	Nominee Honorable Mention	Best Actor in a Short = Visor (2021) 
 Florence Film Awards 2021	Florence Film Award	Best Actor = Visor (2021) 
 AltFF Alternative Film Festival 2021	Fall Award	Best Director = Fistful of Dreams (2021) 
 Actors Award, Los Angeles 2021 Best of The Festival = Visor (2021)

References
 9.^https://newyorkinternationalfilmawards.com/liaan-ferreira/
10.^https://showme.co.za/helderberg/events-entertainment/the-great-gatsby-the-playhouse-theatre/
 
11.^https://issuu.com/bacchusmedia/docs/erm_202111x

12.^https://londonmovieawards.com/jury

13.^https://www.newyorkfilmawards.com/single-post/5th-annual

14.^https://liaanferreira.com/

External links
 IMDb

Living people
South African male television actors
1986 births